The Smith House is a historic house at 806 NW "A" Street in Bentonville, Arkansas.  It is a -story L-shaped Tudor Revival house, with a rubblestone exterior.  Its main (west-facing) facade has a side-gable roof, with two projecting gable sections.  The left one is broader and has a shallow pitch roof, while that at the center is narrower and steeply pitched, sheltering the entrance.  It is decorated with latticework that frames the entrance.  Built c. 1925, it is the only known Tudor Revival style house of this sort in Benton County.

The house was listed on the National Register of Historic Places in 1996.

See also
National Register of Historic Places listings in Benton County, Arkansas

References

Houses on the National Register of Historic Places in Arkansas
Tudor Revival architecture in Arkansas
Houses completed in 1925
Houses in Bentonville, Arkansas
National Register of Historic Places in Bentonville, Arkansas
1925 establishments in Arkansas